Julius von Raatz-Brockmann (29 April 1870 – 7 December 1944) was a German baritone concert singer and voice teacher.

Born in Hamburg, he died in Perleberg at age 74.

Further reading 
 K. J. Kutsch, Leo Riemens: Großes Sängerlexikon. Unchanged edition. K. G. Saur, Bern, 1993, second volume M–Z, 
 Deutsche Biographische Enzyklopädie, 2nd edition, volume 8, 
 Eva Folz: Raatz-Brockmann und die Gesangspädagogik: dem Meister zu seinem 60. Geburtstage am 29. April 1930. Wölbing-Verlag, Berlin, 1930

References

External links 
 
 Raatz-Brockmann Julius von on Operissimo
 

1870 births
1944 deaths
Musicians from Hamburg
German operatic baritones
Voice teachers
Academic staff of the Hochschule für Musik Hanns Eisler Berlin